Raymond, Knight Ceulemans (born 12 July 1937) is a Belgian billiards player who won 21 UMB three-cushion World Championship titles, more than any other player. Along with 48 European titles (23 in three-cushion) and 61 national titles. His nickname is "Mr 100". He was inducted into the Billiard Congress of America's Hall of Fame in 2001, one of the first non-Americans to receive the honour.

In October 2003, King Albert II of Belgium honoured Raymond Ceulemans by awarding him a knighthood (Ridderschap) in recognition of his lifetime achievements.

Early life
He was born in Lier, Belgium. By the age of 7, Ceulemans was playing billiards on the table in his father's café. He also liked to play association football at the local club. Although he was a good midfielder (in 1958 he was discovered by the club K. Beerschot V.A.C. but a transfer was never made) he stopped playing football and began to concentrate on billiards.

Professional career

In 1961 at the age of 23 Ceulemans won his first Belgian three-cushion title. In 1962 he won his first CEB European Three-cushion Championship.

He went on to win the title 11 times in row. The winning streak came to end in 1974 when he lost to Nobuaki Kobayashi in finals. He was the first three-cushion player to reach levels of 1.500 and 2.000 average points per .

Ceulemans won the first Three-Cushion World Cup in Paris, France in 1986; two more titles followed in 1987 and 1990. In 1998 he tied the world record held by Junichi Komori of Japan during professional match play by scoring 28 points in a single . (The record was later broken.)

Ceulemans won the European three-cushion championship 23 times and defended it 19 times.

Ceulemans also won 21 UMB World three-cushion championships. Additionally he has prevailed in 16 title defenses.

At the age of 64 Ceulemans won his latest UMB world title in 2001 in Luxembourg where he defeated Marco Zanetti.

International and national titles
UMB World Three-cushion Championship: 1963–>73, 1975–>80, 1983, 1985, 1990, 2001 (21)
UMB World One-cushion Championship: 1968, 1976, 1977, 1978, 1979, 1984 (6)
UMB World Balkline 47/1 Championship: 1976
UMB World Straight rail Championship: 1969
UMB World Pentathlon Championship: 1965, 1972, 1974, 1975 (4)
UMB Three-Cushion World Cup: 1986, 1987, 1989, 1990-2, 1990-4, 1991, 1992, 1993 (8)
UMB Three-Cushion World Cup Overall Champion: 1986, 1987, 1990 (3)
UMB Three-cushion Grand Prix: 1987, 1988-1, 1988-3, 1991, 1992, 1995 (6)
CEB European Three-cushion Championship: 1962–>72, 1974–>83, 1987, 1992 (23)
CEB European One-cushion Championship: 1963–>1967, 1969, 1970, 1977–>79, 1984–>86 (13)
CEB European Balkline 71/2 Championship: 1963, 1966, 1968, 1971, 1979 (5)
CEB European Balkline 47/1 Championship: 1976
CEB European Pentathlon Championship: 1973, 1979 (2)
CEB European Pentathlon Championship (national teams): 1969, 1971, 1975, 1992 (4)
CEB European Cup: 1967,1968, 1969, 1986 (4)
CEB Grand Prix: 1987, 1988 (2)
Belgian Three-cushion Championship: 1961, 1962, 1964–>68, 1970–>81, 1984, 1986, 1993, 1999, 2001 (24)
Belgian Cup: 1992, 1994, 2001 (3)

Other tournament titles 
Next to the national, European and world titles, Ceulemans won other national and international tournaments, including
International Simonis Cup: 9 victories
Rotterdam Briljant Toernooi: 2 victories in 1991 and 1992
Wetsteijn toernooi: 1 victory in 1991
Boerinnekes Pentathlon Antwerp: 15 victories
Schaal Van Laere tournament Gent: 20 victories

Records

UMB World Three-cushion Championship 

General Average (GA): 1963 (1,307), 1966 (1,345), 1973 (1,478), 1976 (1,500), 1978 (1,679), 1986 (1,745)
Special Average (SA): 1963 (2,068), 1966 (2,500), 1986 (2,631)
High Run (HR): 1974 (14), 1975 (15), 1980 (15)

Three-Cushion World Cup 

General Average (GA): 1986/2 (1,516)
High Run (HR): 1999/5 (15)

CEB European Three-cushion Championship 

General Average (GA): 1963 (1,238), 1969 (1,538), 1971 (1,621), 1991 (1,808)
Special Average (SA): 1964 (1,764), 1965 (1,818), 1965 (2,068), 1969 (2,222), 1972 (2,875)
High Run (HR): 1964 (17), 1973 (20)

Honours and awards 

Belgian Sportsman of the Year: 1967
Belgian Sports Merit Award: 1978
Honorary member of the Royal Belgian Billiard Association KBBB
Honorary member of the Royal Dutch Billiard Association KNNB: 1980
Sportsman of the century of the city Mechelen: 1999
3rd Sportsman of the century of Antwerp province: 2000
Introduced in the Billiard Congress of America Hall of Fame: 2001
Knight in the Belgian Order of Leopold II: 2002
Honorary member of the European Billiard Confederation: 2007
Trophy of Legends: 2018

References

External links

Official web site

Belgian carom billiards players
World champions in three-cushion billiards
World Cup champions in three-cushion billiards
1937 births
Living people
Belgian nobility
People from Lier, Belgium
Sportspeople from Antwerp Province